The Socialists' Party of Galicia (PSdeG–PSOE) is a centre-left political party in Galicia, Spain. It is the Galician affiliate of the Spanish Socialist Workers' Party (PSOE). It defines itself as a Galicianist, social-democratic party.

Electoral performance

Parliament of Galicia

Cortes Generales

European Parliament

Former logos

Notes

References

External links
Official

Xuventudes Socialistas

Galicia
Political parties with year of establishment missing
Social democratic parties in Spain
Socialist parties in Galicia (Spain)